Saima Wazed Hossain (born 9 December 1972), also known as Putul, is a Bangladeshi autism activist. She is the daughter of Bangladesh's Prime Minister, Sheikh Hasina. She is a member of the World Health Organization's 25-member Expert

Early life and education
She was born to Sheikh Hasina, the present Prime Minister of Bangladesh, and M. A. Wazed Miah, a nuclear scientist. Her brother is Sajeeb Wazed Joy. She graduated from Barry University. She is a licensed school psychologist.

Career

She organized the first South Asian conference on Autism in 2011 in Dhaka, Bangladesh. She is the chairperson of National Advisory Committee on Autism and Neurodevelopmental disorders. She campaigned for “Comprehensive and Coordinated Efforts for the Management of Autism Spectrum Disorders” resolution at the World Health Assembly which adopted the resolution, Autism Speaks praised her for spearheading "a truly global push for support for this resolution". She is a member of World Health Organization's 25-member Expert Advisory Panel on mental health.

In November, 2016, Wazed had been elected as chairperson of International Jury Board meeting of UNESCO for Digital Empowerment of Persons with Disabilities.

In April 2017, Wazed has been designated as WHO Champion for Autism” in South-East Asia. In July, 2017 she became the Goodwill Ambassador of the World Health Organization (WHO) for autism in South-East Asia Region. Since 2022, she has been a member of the Commission for Universal Health convened by Chatham House and co-chaired by Helen Clark and Jakaya Kikwete.

Awards
In 2016, Wazed has conferred World Health Organization's South-East Asia Region Award for Excellence in Public Health. In 2017, she has been awarded the International Champion Award for her outstanding contribution to the field of autism. She received a distinguished alumni award from Barry University for her activism.

Personal life
Saima was married to Khandakar Masrur Hossain Mitu, son of Khandaker Mosharraf Hossain. The couple have 4 children.

References

Autism activists
Bangladeshi psychologists
Bangladeshi women psychologists
Barry University alumni
Living people
World Health Organization
Sheikh Mujibur Rahman family
1972 births
Bangladeshi health activists